Alessandro Salati (died 1509) was a Roman Catholic prelate who served as Bishop of Minori (1498–1509).

Biography
On 30 Apr 1498, Alessandro Salati was appointed during the papacy of Pope Alexander VI as Bishop of Minori.
On 17 Jun 1498, he was consecrated bishop by Andrea de Conto, Archbishop of Amalfi, with Matteo Doti, Bishop of Scala, and Tommaso de Acciaro, Bishop of Satriano, serving as co-consecrators. 
He served as Bishop of Minori until his death in 1509.

References

External links and additional sources
 (for Chronology of Bishops) 
 (for Chronology of Bishops) 

15th-century Italian Roman Catholic bishops
16th-century Italian Roman Catholic bishops
Bishops appointed by Pope Alexander VI
1509 deaths